This is a list of all episodes of The Bold Ones.

Season One (1969-70)

Season Two (1970-71)

Season Three (1971-72)

Season Four (1972-73)

See also
The Bold Ones: The New Doctors
The Bold Ones: The Lawyers
The Bold Ones: The Protectors
The Bold Ones: The Senator

Lists of American drama television series episodes